The Zoist: A Journal of Cerebral Physiology & Mesmerism, and Their Applications to Human Welfare was a British journal, devoted to the promotion of the theories and practices (and the collection and dissemination of reports of the applications) of the pseudoscientific concepts of mesmerism and phrenology, and the enterprise of "connecting and harmonizing practical science with little understood laws governing the mental structure of man". The name derived from the Greek word Zoe (ζωή) meaning "life". The Zoist was published quarterly, without a break, for fifteen years: from March 1843 until January 1856.

Edited by John Elliotson, the founder, and former president of the London Phrenological Society, who had been expelled from the University College Hospital in 1838 for his mesmeric practices, and William Collins Engledue, a former President of the British Phrenological Association, who was ostracized by both his medical colleagues for his dedication to mesmerism and phrenology, and by the majority of phrenologists for his rejection of their "socio-religious", spiritual position,<ref>Such as that maintained by William Scott, President of the Edinburgh Phrenological Society, in his The Harmony of Phrenology with Scripture: Shewn in a Refutation of the Philosophical Errors contained in Mr Combe's "Constitution of Man" (1837); and by Mrs John Pugh (S.D. Pugh) in her Phrenology considered in a religious light; or, Thoughts and readings consequent on the perusal of [G. 'Combe's Constitution of man'.] Phrenology Considered in a Religious Light; or, Thoughts and Readings Consequent on the Perusal of "Combe's Constitution of Man" (1846)], etc.</ref> in favour of a scientific, materialist, brain-centred position that, in effect, reduced mental operations to physical forces.

"The Zoist was a materialist journal; it repudiated metaphysics and argued that everything—including human thinking—could be explained through the laws of the physical universe ..."

The journalThe Zoist's first edition was published in January 1843. It was published quarterly, without a break, for fifteen years from March 1843 until January 1856, and each quarterly issue cost 2s.6d.

It was also published in annual volumes; and the first twelve annual volumes were published simultaneously by Hippolyte Ballière, in London, J.B. Ballière, in Paris, and T.O. Weigel, in Leipzig; the thirteenth and last volume was published by Arthur Hall, Virtue, and Co., in London.

Similar publications
Aside from the already established journal, The Phrenological Journal and Miscellany, which ran from 1823 to 1847, and The Phrenological Almanac, which ran from 1842 to 1845, published by the Glasgow Phrenological Society, there was Spencer T. Hall's The Phreno-Magnet and Mirror of Nature: A Record of Facts, Experiments, and Discoveries in Phrenology, Magnetism, &c., which lasted for eleven monthly issues (from February 1843 to December 1843), the short-lived Mesmerist: A Journal of Vital Magnetism, which only lasted for twenty weekly issues (from 13 May 1843 to 23 September 1843), The Annals of Mesmerism and Mesmero-Phrenology, which lasted for three monthly issues (from July 1843 to September 1843), and The People's Phrenological Journal and Compendium of Mental and Moral Science, published weekly, by the Exeter and London Phrenological Societies, for two years (1843 to 1844).

Then, to add to the mix, James Braid's definitive work on hypnotism, Neurypnology or The Rationale of Nervous Sleep, Considered in Relation with Animal Magnetism, Illustrated by Numerous Cases of its Successful Application in the Relief and Cure of Disease was released in July 1843.

Cerebral Physiology & Mesmerism
The choice of the "Cerebral Physiology & Mesmerism" sub-title for their journal—rather than, that is, "Animal Magnetism & Phrenology"—is a measure of the pragmatic, materialist, "leading edge" proto-scientific orientation of both Elliotson and Engledue.

Their deliberately chosen term "cerebral physiology" (coined by Engledue) was entirely consistent with the original anatomy-centred term of "cranioscopy" (German) chosen by the German neuroanatomist Franz Joseph Gall; and it was intentionally applied—rather than the (then) prevailing English, metaphysical, mind-centred term, "phrenology" coined by Thomas Forster (see Forster (1815) – to distinguish their own rational, sceptical, proto-scientific efforts in pursuit of a scientific understanding of (what would be termed, today) "brain science", from the superstitious "phrenology" (which was eventually universally dismissed as a flawed pseudoscience).

Similarly, their choice of term "mesmerism" was intentionally applied to indicate that, whilst they were deeply committed to a scientific ratification, and neurophysiological investigation of the phenomena supposedly produced by mesmeric methods, their interest was almost exclusively in the consequences of the applications of the practices of Franz Mesmer, rather than paying any particular attention to the wide range of metaphysical theories of the "animal magnetists".

Scope
Apart from providing literature reviews and announcements of new publications, The Zoist was a source of information, disciplinary interaction, original accounts of phenomena, relevant case studies of its application to wide range of conditions, ranging from epilepsy, stammering, and headache, to torticollis, asthma, and rheumatism, and extensive reports of pertinent innovations and discoveries.

Elliotson was an opponent of capital punishment, and argued, within the Zoist, based upon his phrenological analysis of the heads of executed murderers, that not only was phrenology true, but also that, from this, capital punishment was futile as a deterrent.

According to Gauld (1992, pp. 219–243), apart from its concentration on mesmerism and phrenology, The Zoist was one of the principal sources for information, discussion, and education in the following domains of interest:
(1) Mesmeric Analgesia: although The Zoist would become the major vehicle for the (post-1846) reports of James Esdaile's work in India, it completely ignored the extensive (early 1842) work reported by Braid in his Neurypnology (1843, p. 253). Elliotson had already published his Numerous Cases of Surgical Operations without Pain in early 1843.
(2) Phreno-mesmerism (a.k.a. phreno-magnetism)In his extended discussion of phrenology, in Chapter 6, of his Neurypnology (1843, pp. 79–149), James Braid clearly states (p. 105) that he began his investigations of phreno-mesmerism—which he deals with at pp. 105–149in April 1842 (just six weeks before Neurypnology was sent to the printer); and, it also extremely clear that, as a result of the researches and experiments undertaken over an extended period of time, Braid became convinced that there was no justification in the claims of the phreno-mesmerists (see Braid, !844). and hemicerebral mesmerism (the mesmerization of each hemisphere of the brain separately).
(3) "Reichenbach phenomena" and other matters.
(4) Electro-biology and related matters.
(5) Alleged instances of extra-sensory perception (ESP) occurring in a mesmeric context.

Influence
Unlike France, where the conflict between the conventional medical establishment and the advocates of mesmerism took place in the public/political arena, the British debate between the conventional medical establishment and the scientific advocates of mesmerism, such as Elliotson and Engledue, took place mainly in the medical literature on the one hand (such as Wakley's Lancet), and The Zoist on the other.

Given Wakley's implacable opposition to Elliotson, it is not surprising that, from time to time, "The Lancet continued to fulminate against the mesmerists" maintaining that "all those connected with The Zoist were 'lepers', and doctors who practised mesmerism, traitors...".

Stress on the power of the imagination
A constant aspect of The Zoist's approach was its stress on the power of the imagination. In January 1855, in an article summarizing the Zoist's extensive coverage of the issue over more than a decade, Elliotson wrote of how, "in mesmeric states the effect of imagination is far greater than in the ordinary state, and we suspect that in persons not in the mesmeric state, but who have been formerly mesmerised, the power is far greater than in those who have never been mesmerised".

Contributions
Apart from Elliotson, Engledue, and an otherwise (at the time) unidentified constant contributor, operating under the nom de guerre of "L.E.G.E.", and apart from its exhaustive reports of the clinical and social applications of mesmerism and phrenology, and pain-free medical and dental surgery, and progress reports from the London mesmeric Infirmary, The Zoist featured an exceptionally wide range of items contributed by a wide range of contributors (many of whom remained anonymous) from Britain, the colonies, and the United States. For example:
 Three phrenological articles by Herbert Spencer: "A New View of the Functions of Imitation and Benevolence", "On the Situation of the Organ of Amativeness", and "A Theory concerning the Organ of Wonder".
 A poem written by Miss Anna Savage, reprinted from her recently released collection, Angel Visits (1845): "The Magnetic Sleeper".
 The publication of a previously unpublished paper, written by Thomas Symes Prideaux, esq. of Southampton in June 1839, which advocated using phrenology to select members of parliament (originally written for a "best essay" competition conducted in 1839 by the Phrenological Journal): "On the Application of Phrenology in the Choice of Parliamentary Representatives".Prideaux appended the following note to the publication: "It must be remembered that this was written nearly seven years ago. Phrenology since this period has made rapid strides towards being regarded as an accepted science. A phrenological chair has lately been instituted in one of our universities. The subject has been popularized by the allusions of writers of fiction and others, and an expression of disbelief in the science would not be considered a mark of ignorance by most persons having any pretension to keep pace with the knowledge of the day." (p. 416)
 Another poem from Miss Anna Savage, "suggested by the reply of a slave, who, on being asked to describe his feelings in the mesmeric state, answered, 'As I never felt before—free'.": "Verses by Miss Savage".
 A letter from Harriet Martineau describing her mesmeric treatment of a cow: "Mesmeric Cure of a Cow".
 A second letter from Harriet Martineau describing the angry visit of the veterinarian who had previously tried, in vain, to treat her dangerously ill cow (which was now quite well), on his hearing the news of its recovery: "Distressing effects in a Doctor upon the removal of a Disease from a Cow with Mesmerism".
 A contribution by Lieutenant Richard F. Burton, of Bombay: "Remarks upon a form of Sub-mesmerism, popularly called Electro-Biology, now practised in Scinde and other Eastern Countries".
 A communication from William John Tubbs, L.S.A. (London), M.R.C.S. (England), surgeon and mesmerist, of Upwell, Cambridgeshire to the effect that the son of John Tuck, labourer of Norfolk, and Elizabeth Tuck (née Rollins) had been christened "Mesmer":

 In response to a query from "A Patient", the editors of The Zoist, whilst assuring the enquirer that "we feel as much as he does the difficulty of procuring good mesmerisers", proceeded to set down a set of positive and negative selection criteria: "Choice of a Mesmeriser".
 Yet another poem, this time from Mrs Maria Abdy, widow of the late Rev. John Channing Abdy, M.A., of St. John's, Southwark: "The Mesmerist".

The end of The Zoist
In a parting address to their journal's readers and subscribers written on 31 December 1855, the editors of The Zoist reminded their readers that they had sought "neither pecuniary gain nor worldly reputation", and had willingly undertaken the enterprise despite the fact that "loss was nearly certain", and that "contempt, ridicule, virulent abuse, and serious injury, were all inevitable".

Yet, they assured their readers, "the object for which The Zoist was undertaken"—namely, "the establishment of truths, splendid, exquisite, extensive in their bearings, and of the highest importance to the moral and corporeal well-being of mankind"—had been attained; and that it was their hope that it would "be regarded as a complete work which has come out in fifty-two numbers", and be recognized as "a rich store", and would be used as "a solid work of reference for years to come": see Gallery.

Footnotes

References

 Braid, J., "Experimental Inquiry, to Determine whether Hypnotic and Mesmeric Manifestations can be Adduced in Proof of Phrenology", The Medical Times, Vol. 11, No. 271, (30 November 1844), pp. 181–182.
 Braid, J., Neurypnology or the Rationale of Nervous Sleep Considered in Relation with Animal Magnetism Illustrated by Numerous Cases of its Successful Application in the Relief and Cure of Disease, John Churchill, (London), 1843.N.B. Braid's Errata, detailing a number of important corrections that need to be made to the foregoing text, is on the un-numbered page following p. 265.
 Carpenter, W.B., Principles of Mental Physiology: With their Chief Applications to the Psychology, Pathology, Therapeutics, Hygiene, and Forensic Medicine (Fifth Edition), John Churchill, (London), 1855.
 Carpenter, W.B., "On the Influence of Suggestion in Modifying and directing Muscular Movement, independently of Volition", Royal Institution of Great Britain, (Proceedings), 1852, (12 March 1852), pp. 147–153.
 Clarke, J.F., "A Strange Chapter in the History of Medicine", pp. 155–169 in [1874], Clarke, J.F., Autobiographical Recollections of the Medical Profession, J. & A. Churchill, (London,), 1874.
 Collyer, R.H., Psychography, or, The Embodiment of Thought: With an Analysis of Phreno-magnetism, "Neurology", and Mental Hallucination, Including Rules to Govern and Produce the Magnetic State, Zeiber & Co., (Philadelphia), 1843.
 Cooter, R J., "Phrenology and British Alienists, c. 1825–1845, Part I: Converts to a Doctrine", Medical History, Vol. 20, No. 1, (January 1976), pp. 1–21. doi:10.1017/S0025727300021761
 Cooter, R J., "Phrenology and British Alienists, c. 1825–1845, Part II: Doctrine and Practice", Medical History, Vol. 20, No. 2, (April 1976), pp. 135–151. doi:10.1017/S0025727300022195
 Cooter, R.J., The Cultural Meaning of Popular Science: Phrenology and the Organization of Consent in Nineteenth-Century Britain, Cambridge University Press, (Cambridge), 1984.
 Darnton, R., Mesmerism, and the End of the Enlightenment in France, Harvard University Press, (Cambridge), 1968.
 Elliotson, J., The Harveian Oration, Delivered before the Royal College of Physicians, London 1846, by John Elliotson, M.D. Cantab. F.R.S., Fellow of the College, With an English Version and Notes, (1846).
 Elliotson, J., "The Use of the Sulphate of Copper in Chronic Diarrhoea, to which are added some Observations on the use of Acupuncture in Rheumatism", Medico-Chirurgical Transactions, Vol. 13, Part 2, (1827), pp. 451–468.
 Forster, T., "Observations on a New System of Phrenology, or the Anatomy and Physiology of the Brain, of Drs. Gall and Spurzheim", Philosophical Magazine and Journal, Vol. 45, No. 201, (January 1815), pp. 44–50.
 Gauld, A., A History of Hypnotism, Cambridge University Press, (Cambridge), 1992
 Inglis, B., Natural and Supernatural: A History of the Paranormal (Revised Edition), Prism Press, (Bridport), 1992.
 Kurshan, I., "Mind Reading: Literature in the Discourse of Early Victorian Phrenology and Mesmerism", pp. 17–38 in Willis, M. and Wynne, C. (eds), Victorian Literary Mesmerism, Rodopi, (Amsterdam), 2006.
 "Mesmeric Amputation", Medico-Chirurgical Review, and Journal of Practical Medicine, No. 75, (1 January 1843), pp. 280–282.
 Moore, W., The Mesmerist: The Society Doctor Who Held Victorian London Spellbound, Weidenfeld & Nicolson, (London), 2017. 
 Rosen, G., "Mesmerism and Surgery: A Strange Chapter in the History of Anesthesia", Journal of the History of Medicine and Allied Sciences, Vol. 1, No. 4, (October 1946), pp. 527–550. doi:10.1093/jhmas/1.4.527
 Ruth, J., "'Gross Humbug' or 'The Language of Truth'? The Case of the Zoist", Victorian Periodicals Review, Vol. 32, No. 4, (Winter 1999), pp. 299–323.
 Stephen, L., "Combe, George (1788–1858)", pp. 427–429 in Stephen, L. (ed), Dictionary of National Biography, Vol. XI: Clater-Condell, Smith, Elder, & Co., (London), 1887.
 Topham, W. & Ward, W.S., Account of a Case of Successful Amputation of the Thigh, During the Mesmeric State, Without the Knowledge of the Patient. Read to the Royal Medical and Chirurgical Society of London on Tuesday 22nd November, 1842, H. Baillière, (London), 1842.
 University of Edinburgh, List of the Graduates in Medicine in the University of Edinburgh from MDCCV to MDCCCLXVI, Neill & Company, (Edinburgh), 1867.
 Winter, A., Mesmerized: Powers of Mind in Victorian Britain, The University of Chicago Press, (Chicago), 1998.

External links

 Student Record for John Elliotson – University of Edinburgh, Centre for Research Collections, Individual Records, Students of Medicine (1762–1826)
 Elliotson's (1810) M.D. graduation record: "Jo. Elliotson, Anglus. De inflammation" ("John Elliotson, England. [Title of inaugural dissertation]: Inflammation") – University of Edinburgh (1867), p. 42.
 Elliotson's entry in the first edition of the British Medical Directory (1853) – The Lancet (1853)
 Elliotson's (greatly diminished in size) entry in the second edition of the British Medical Directory (1854) – The Lancet (1854)
 Elliotson's entry in the first edition of The Medical Register  (1860)The General Medical Council (1859): This entry verifies that Elliotson was registered (as of 1 January 1859, the first day of the registration system) as a practitioner under the Medical Act 1858 (an Act to Regulate the Qualifications of Practitioners in Medicine and Surgery), which took effect on 1 October 1858: the Act's official date of commencement.
 Engledue’s (1835) M.D. graduation record: "Gulielmus C. Engledue, Anglus. What evidence do we have that the External Senses can be transferred to other parts of the body, as is said to occur in Somnambulism?" ("William C. Engledue, England") – University of Edinburgh (1867), p. 103: From 1834 onwards, English titles of inaugural M.D. dissertations were permitted.
 Engledue's entry in the first edition of the British Medical Directory (1853)The Lancet (1853)
 Engledue's entry in the second edition of the British Medical Directory (1854).The Lancet (1854)
 Doctor W. C. Engledue, Chairman at the Banquet Held in September 1856 to Welcome Home Other Ranks from the Crimea, Proposing the Royal Toast: an 1856 painting by Portsmouth artist and photographer Richard Poate (1811–1878) – in the Collection of the Portsmouth City Museum
 The banquet was held on Tuesday, 16 September 1856: see The Spectator, Vol. 29, No. 1473, (Saturday, 20 September 1856), p. 991; and "Crimean Banquet at Portsmouth", The Times'', No. 22475, (Wednesday, 17 September 1856), p. 9, col. B.

1843 establishments in the United Kingdom
Alternative and traditional medicine journals
English-language journals
Publications established in 1843
Quarterly journals
Phrenology
Neuroscience journals
History of neuroscience
History of mental health in the United Kingdom
Fringe science journals
Physiology journals
Hypnosis
Publications disestablished in 1856
Defunct journals of the United Kingdom
Academic journals associated with learned and professional societies